The Park was a cricket ground situated in the grounds of the mansion of George Finch, 9th Earl of Winchilsea at Burley-on-the-Hill in Rutland.

It was used for first-class cricket in 1790, when an early all-England team played a Hampshire team.  The fixture was repeated the following year.  Also in 1791, an Old Etonians side played the Marylebone Cricket Club.  In 1792 the Earl of Winchilsea's XI played Assheton Smith's XI.  In 1793, England played a Surrey team at the ground.  The final first-class match held on the ground was during the same year when the Earl of Winchilsea's XI played R Leigh's XI.  The final recorded match held on the ground was in 1814 when Rutland played Nottingham.
 
The grounds of the mansion has been used for occasional cricket matches in recent decades including in 1994 the Lord's Taverners against a Rutland XI to mark 300 years since the house was constructed.

References

Bibliography
 G. B. Buckley, Fresh Light on 18th Century Cricket, Cotterell, 1935.
 Arthur Haygarth, Scores & Biographies, Volume 1 (1744–1826), Lillywhite, 1862.
 H. T. Waghorn, The Dawn of Cricket, Electric Press, 1906.

1790 establishments in England
Cricket grounds in Rutland
Defunct cricket grounds in England
Defunct sports venues in Rutland
English cricket venues in the 18th century
History of Rutland
Sports venues completed in 1790